Thy Kingdom Come is the eighth studio album by American singer CeCe Winans. It was released by PureSprings Gospel and EMI Gospel on April 1, 2008. The album rose to number 57 on the US Billboard 200, also reaching number 12 on the Top R&B/Hip-Hop Albums and number one the Top Gospel Albums. Thy Kingdom Come received the Best Pop/Contemporary Gospel Album award at the 51st Grammy Awards in 2009.

Background 
Winans originally intended to release a collection of Hymmals entitled Hymns At Heart which was set for release in November 2007, however, the release date was postponed indefinitely. On January 22, 2008, Winans posted on her blog that she would be releasing an album on April 1, 2008. News outlets began reporting in February that the studio album would be called Thy Kingdom Come and featured the song "Waging War".

Singles
The lead single for the album, "Thy Will Be Done", was released digitally on the iTunes Store on January 1, 2008. The second single, "Waging War", was released on March 4, 2008. "It Ain't Over", the album's third single, was released around August 2008.

Critical reception

Allmusic editor Andree Farias found that "the album is one of the churchiest the singer has released yet [...] Thy Kingdom Come sees Winans doing justice to her family name and singing almost exclusively for the saints – songs of praise, songs of encouragement, songs of worship, songs of inspiration. But the fact that this is an album for the church doesn't mean it sounds like Sunday morning [...] As is expected of Winans, the songs are expertly produced, the ballads are beautifully orchestrated, the urban pieces are as urban as Whitney in her prime. In other words, Thy Kingdom Come is precisely what a CeCe album should sound like, which isn't to say she's settling for the middle road."

Track listing

Notes
  denotes a co-producer

Charts

Weekly charts

Year-end charts

Awards

The album was nominated for a Dove Award for Contemporary Gospel Album of the Year at the 40th GMA Dove Awards.

References

External links
 

CeCe Winans albums
2008 albums